The women's football tournament at the 1996 Summer Olympics in Atlanta was held from 21 July to 1 August 1996. The women's tournament was a full international tournament with no restrictions on age. The eight national teams involved in the tournament were required to register a squad of 16 players, including two goalkeepers. Additionally, teams could name a maximum of four alternate players, numbered from 17 to 20. The alternate list could contain at most three outfielders, as at least one slot was reserved for a goalkeeper. In the event of serious injury during the tournament, an injured player could be replaced by one of the players in the alternate list. Only players in these squads were eligible to take part in the tournament.

The age listed for each player is on 21 July 1996, the first day of the tournament. The numbers of caps and goals listed for each player do not include any matches played after the start of the tournament. The club listed is the club for which the player last played a competitive match prior to the tournament.

Group E

China PR
Head coach: Ma Yuanan

China PR named a squad of 16 players and 4 alternates for the tournament.

Denmark
Head coach: Keld Gantzhorn

Denmark named a squad of 16 players and 3 alternates for the tournament.

Sweden
Head coach: Bengt Simonsson

Sweden named a squad of 16 players and 4 alternates for the tournament.

United States
Head coach: Tony DiCicco

The United States named a squad of 16 players and 4 alternates for the tournament. Lorrie Fair was invited to the squad as an alternate, but declined due to her disappointment of not making the team.

Group F

Brazil
Head coach: José Duarte

Brazil named a squad of 16 players and 4 alternates for the tournament. During the tournament, Kátia replaced Nilda due to injury.

Germany
Head coach: Gero Bisanz

Germany named a squad of 16 players and 4 alternates for the tournament.

Japan
Head coach: Tamotsu Suzuki

Japan named a squad of 16 players and 4 alternates for the tournament.

Norway
Head coach: Even Pellerud

Norway named a squad of 16 players and 3 alternates for the tournament. During the tournament, Tone Gunn Frustøl replaced Heidi Støre due to injury.

References

External links
 Olympic Football Tournaments Atlanta 1996 – Women, FIFA.com

Squads
1996